Charles Augustin Wauters (23 April 1808, Boom – 4 November 1869, Mechelen) was a Belgian painter.

He was born in Boom, Antwerp, on 21 April 1808 or 23 April 1811. According to Marc Eemans he was born in 1809. Wauters painted both genre scenes and religious subjects. He was also an engraver. He studied at the academies of Mechelen (where he later became director) and Antwerp, and also under Philippe-Jacques van Bree. A monument in his  honour was unveiled at the St. Andrew's Church in Antwerp. He died in Mechelen on 4 November 1869.

Gallery

References

External links

1808 births
1869 deaths
19th-century Belgian painters
19th-century Belgian male artists
Artists from Antwerp
People from Boom, Belgium